Joaquín Sabina y Viceversa en directo (Joaquín Sabina & Viceversa live) is the second live album of the Spanish singer-songwriter Joaquín Sabina, which was recorded live in the Salamanca Theatre of Madrid on February 14 and 15, 1986. This album is the second release of Joaquín Sabina under Ariola and also his second and last collaboration with the band Viceversa, led by Pancho Varona.

Background 
Since the release of Juez y parte (Judge and side) the previous year, the popularity of Sabina started growing significantly to the point that the performer started a tour around many cities of Spain. This successful tur ended in Madrid, where this album was recorded. The songs performed in this record cover the albums: Inventario, Malas Compañías, Ruleta Rusa and Juez y parte including some new songs. During the concert, some invited artist took part on it including Javier Krahe, who had previously collaborated with Sabina in the album La mandrágora and Luis Eduardo Aute, who performed, during the concert, a song dedicated to Sabina entitled "Pongamos que hablo de Joaquín" (Let's say I'm talking about Joaquín). Other collaborators in the concert are Javier Gurruchaga and Jaume Sisa.

Controversy 
In 1986 Sabina participated in a campaign against the Spanish NATO membership. Although the country finally ended up staying inside the organisation after a referendum, the left wing sector of the Spanish politics, to which Sabina belonged to, reacted negatively to this fact. As a reaction, the performer interpreted during the concert, in a duo with Javier Krahe, a song entitled "Cuervo ingenuo" (Naive crow), which criticised the political ambiguity of PSOE, the ruling party and Felipe González, its leader and Spanish president.

Track listing 
CD 1:CD2:

Reception 
Due to the success of the tour and partly because the controversy created by some of the songs, this album turned into the commercial breakthrough of Joaquín Sabina.  In fact, its sales were much higher than all his previous releases. Two decades later, it was released a DVD version of this album.

References

External links 
 Joaquín Sabina y Viceversa en directo in Joaquín Sabina's official website.

1986 live albums
Joaquín Sabina albums
Live albums by Spanish artists